Ballardvale station is an MBTA Commuter Rail station on the Haverhill Line, located in the Ballardvale village of Andover, Massachusetts.

History
The Andover and Haverhill Railroad opened through Ballardvale in 1836. The original depot was converted to a residence.

A two-story Italianate depot was built in 1849 at the Andover Street crossing to serve as the new Ballardvale station. A baggage room was added around 1893. In 1950, it was cut in half, moved , and converted to a private residence. The baggage room was detached and served as the station shelter for some time.

In November 1974, North Andover and Andover declined to renew their subsidies. Service to North Andover station ended on November 15 that year. Days before, Andover commuters and businesses raised funds to continue service until April 1975. On April 7, 1975, town residents voted "overwhelmingly" to reimburse the commuters and subsidize service for an additional year. The town declined to subsidize further service, and the three Andover stops (Shawsheen, and Ballardvale) were dropped effective April 2, 1976. The round trip, by then stopping just at Lawrence, Bradford and Haverhill, was ended in June 1976. The MBTA bought all B&M commuter equipment and lines on December 27, 1976, including the Western Route from Wilmington Junction to the New Hampshire border.

Service to Haverhill, including the stop at Ballardvale, resumed on December 17, 1979. A mini-high platform for accessibility was added around 1992. Ballardvale station was left as single track after the 2010–2017 double-tracking project. However, the MBTA currently plans to reconstruct the station and add a second track.

References

External links

MBTA – Ballardvale
Station from Andover Street from Google Maps Street View

Stations along Boston and Maine Railroad lines
MBTA Commuter Rail stations in Essex County, Massachusetts
Railway stations in the United States opened in 1836